"Brace" is a song by Australian band, Birds of Tokyo. It was written by the group and released on 21 September 2016 as the lead single from the band's fifth studio album, Brace.

At the APRA Music Awards of 2018 the song won Rock Work of the Year.

Track listing
"Brace" - 4:48

References 

2016 singles
2016 songs
EMI Records singles
Birds of Tokyo songs
APRA Award winners